Piaye is a community on the island of Saint Lucia; it is located on the southern coast, near Balembouche and Bongalo in the Laborie District, and shares its name with a nearby river. This community started as a small settlement of workers who laboured on the Balembouche estate. In the post-Balembouche period Piaye transformed into a community of fishermen, subsistence farmers and producers of hand-crushed aggregate for the construction industry.

See also
List of cities in Saint Lucia
Districts of Saint Lucia
Piaye River
Piaye Bay (Anse Piaye)

References
 

Towns in Saint Lucia